The commune of Vumbi is a commune of Kirundo Province in northern Burundi. The capital lies at Vumbi.
About 1500 Rwandan refugees were in Vumbi commune during the genocide.

References

Communes of Burundi
Kirundo Province